The 2023 Campeonato Brasileiro Série B will be a football competition held in Brazil, equivalent to the second division. The competition will begin on 15 April and will end on 25 November.

Twenty teams will compete in the tournament, twelve returning from the 2022 season, four promoted from the 2022 Campeonato Brasileiro Série C (ABC, Botafogo-SP, Mirassol and Vitória), and four relegated from the 2022 Campeonato Brasileiro Série A (Atlético Goianiense, Avaí, Ceará and Juventude).

The top four teams will be promoted to the 2024 Campeonato Brasileiro Série A.

Teams
Twenty teams will compete in the league – twelve teams from the previous season, as well as four teams promoted from the Série C, and four teams relegated from the Série A.

Number of teams by state

Stadiums and locations

Personnel and kits

Managerial changes

Notes

League table

Positions by round
The table lists the positions of teams after each week of matches. In order to preserve chronological evolvements, any postponed matches were not included to the round at which they were originally scheduled, but added to the full round they were played immediately afterwards.

Results

References

Campeonato Brasileiro Série B seasons
2
2023 in Brazilian football